Dingley may refer to:

Places
 Dingley, Northamptonshire, England
 Dingley, Missouri, United States
 Dingley Island, Maine, United States
 Dingley Village, Victoria, Australia
 Stanford Dingley, a village in Berkshire, England
 Dingley Hall, a hotel on Sodor (fictional island)

Other uses
 Dingley (surname)
 The Dingleys, an early South African television family drama

See also 
 Dingley Act (shipping), an 1884 merchant marine law in the United States
 Dingley Act, an 1897 tariff law in the United States
 Frank L. Dingley House, an historic house in Auburn, Maine